This is a list of items that have been released by the American record label Volcano Entertainment.

General information
Volcano Entertainment has released much of its own material, however, it is also responsible for reissuing releases by Zoo Entertainment (its predecessor), Capricorn Records and Scotti Bros. Records.

The Release Date column is reserved for the date which Volcano released their branded version of the release, not the original release date.

The Original Label and Original Release Date columns are for the information on the release that Volcano has reissued.

In some cases (notably with Scotti. Bros reissues), Volcano has reissued something that was already reissued or remastered.  In those cases, both dates are put in the "Original Release Date" column.

Original Label key
For the Original Label column, the following short-forms are used for the labels in the chart below.  Any other labels are mentioned in whole.

Catalog Number Scheme
Initially, Volcano releases had the catalog number prefix 61422-3XXXX-X where the first 4 Xs are the unique number identifying the release and the last X designates the format.  Thus, different formats have the same first four Xs with a distinguishing number at the end.  However, there are some cases where different formats have altogether different catalog numbers.

Volcano began using BMG's consolidated 82876-XXXXX-X system along with many of Zomba's other sublabels following the Zomba Media Group's sale to that company.

Format Numbers
1: 12" vinyl
2: CD
3: VHS
4: Cassette
7: 7" vinyl
9: DVD

61422-3XXXX-X era (approx. 1996–2003)

Discographies of American record labels